Sladun Peninsula is the predominantly ice-covered 4.58 km wide peninsula projecting from Danco Coast, Antarctic Peninsula 5.2 km into Gerlache Strait south of Cierva Cove and north of Duarte Cove.  It ends in Cierva Point and Sucia Point to the west.

The feature is named after the settlement of Sladun in Southern Bulgaria.

Location
British mapping in 1978.

Maps
 British Antarctic Territory.  Scale 1:200000 topographic map.  DOS 610 Series, Sheet W 64 60.  Directorate of Overseas Surveys, UK, 1978.
 Antarctic Digital Database (ADD). Scale 1:250000 topographic map of Antarctica. Scientific Committee on Antarctic Research (SCAR). Since 1993, regularly upgraded and updated.

References
 Sladun Peninsula. SCAR Composite Antarctic Gazetteer.
 Bulgarian Antarctic Gazetteer. Antarctic Place-names Commission. (details in Bulgarian, basic data in English)

External links
 Rozhen Peninsula. Copernix satellite image

Bulgaria and the Antarctic
Peninsulas of Graham Land
Danco Coast